This is a partial list of the many of colonial era mansions in Sri Lanka.

Colombo

Alfred House 
Clare House
India House
Jefferson House
Lakshmigiri 
Modera House
Morven
President's House
Rock House
Srawasthi Mandiraya
Sirimathipaya Mansion
Sirinivasa
Temple Trees
The Lighthouse
Visumpaya
Whist Bungalow
Winyatts

Elsewhere
 Richmond Castle, Kalutara
 Arcadia, Diyatalawa
 Adisham Hall
 Closenberg Hotel, Galle 
 Kethumathie, Panadura 
 Mel-Ville, Moratuwa

References

Houses in Sri Lanka
Houses in Colombo
Manor houses in Sri Lanka